Arnar Jahrmann Førsund (born 29 July 1986) is a Norwegian footballer who plays for Ørn Horten. He played on top level for the Norwegian clubs Vålerenga, Sandefjord, Kongsvinger, HamKam and Manglerud Star.

Club career
He made his Tippeligaen debut on 19 September 2004 for Vålerenga against Molde in a 4–0 win. He didn't feature anymore for the first team that season.

During the next season he only played a couple of cup matches before being loaned out to Sandefjord in the 1. divisjon during the second half of the season, helping them to a promotion to the top level. When he returned to Vålerenga he featured in two Royal League games.

In 2006, he spent the whole season on loan, again at Sandefjord, who had been promoted to the top-flight. In 2007, he went on his third loan spell, this time to 1. divisjon side Kongsvinger. He was recalled halfway through the season.

After the 2007 season he rejected a new contract and instead moved to Ham-Kam on a Bosman transfer. He spent two seasons there, first getting relegated from the top division, and then in 2009 another relegation from 1. divisjon. After the 2009 season he and several other players were sacked after rejecting a 70% wage-cut, with the club blaming it on poor economy.

In 2010, he joined 2. divisjon side Manglerud Star, before joining Kongsvinger in 2011.

Ahead of the 2013 season he went on to Eidsvold Turn, and moved home to Horten and Ørn-Horten in the summer of 2014. His final outing came in 2017 at IL Flint.

Four years after retiring, Førsund made a comeback for Ørn Horten in the 2021 Norwegian Football Cup, going on to play in the 2021 3. divisjon for the team.

International career
Førsund has played at numerous youth levels. He made his debut for the Norwegian U21 team on 1 January 2006 against Turkey U21. In total he played 17 games for the U21 team, scoring 3 goals. In addition, he has played 29 games at younger levels.

References

1986 births
Living people
People from Horten
Norway youth international footballers
Norway under-21 international footballers
Norwegian footballers
FK Ørn-Horten players
Vålerenga Fotball players
Sandefjord Fotball players
Kongsvinger IL Toppfotball players
Hamarkameratene players
Manglerud Star Toppfotball players
Eidsvold TF players
Eliteserien players
Norwegian First Division players
Association football defenders
Sportspeople from Vestfold og Telemark